Lincoln is a cathedral city and district in Lincolnshire, England, of which it is the county town. In the 2021 Census, the Lincoln district had a population of 103,813. The 2011 census gave the urban area of Lincoln, including North Hykeham and Waddington, a population of 115,000.

Roman Lindum Colonia developed from an Iron Age settlement on the River Witham. Landmarks include Lincoln Cathedral (English Gothic architecture; for over 200 years the world's tallest building) and the 11th-century Norman Lincoln Castle. The city hosts the University of Lincoln, Bishop Grosseteste University, Lincoln City F.C. and Lincoln United F.C.. Lincoln is the largest settlement in Lincolnshire, with the towns of Grimsby second largest and Scunthorpe third.

History

Earliest history

The earliest origins of Lincoln can be traced to remains of an Iron Age settlement of round wooden dwellings, discovered by archaeologists in 1972, which have been dated to the 1st century BCE. It was built by a deep pool (now Brayford Pool) in the River Witham at the foot of a large hill, on which the Normans later built Lincoln Cathedral and Lincoln Castle).

The name Lincoln may come from this period, when the settlement is thought to have been named in the Brittonic language of Iron Age Britain's Celtic inhabitants as Lindon, "The Pool", presumably referring to Brayford Pool (compare the etymology of Dublin, from the Gaelic dubh linn "black pool"). The extent of the original settlement is unknown, as its remains are buried beneath the later Roman and medieval ruins and modern Lincoln.

Lindum Colonia

The Romans conquered this part of Britain in 48 CE and soon built a legionary fortress high on a hill overlooking the natural lake, Brayford Pool, formed by the widening of the River Witham, and the northern end of the Fosse Way Roman road (A46). Celtic Lindon was later Latinised to Lindum and the title Colonia added when it became settled by army veterans.

The conversion to a colonia occurred when the legion moved on to York (Eboracum) in 71 CE. Lindum colonia or more fully, Colonia Domitiana Lindensium, after the then Emperor Domitian, was set up within the walls of the hilltop fortress by extending it with about an equal area, down the hillside to the waterside.

It became a flourishing settlement accessible from the sea through the River Trent and through the River Witham. On the basis of a patently corrupt list of British bishops said to have attended the 314 Council of Arles, the city is often seen as having been the capital of the province of Flavia Caesariensis, formed during the late 3rd-century Diocletian Reforms. Subsequently, the town and its waterways declined. By the close of the 5th century, it was largely deserted, although some occupation continued under a Praefectus Civitatis – Saint Paulinus visited a man holding this office in Lincoln in 629 CE.

Lincylene

Germanic tribes from the North Sea area settled Lincolnshire in the 5th to 6th centuries. The Latin Lindum Colonia shrank in Old English to Lindocolina, then to Lincylene.

After the first Viking raids, the city again rose to some importance with overseas trading ties. In Viking times Lincoln had its own mint, by far the most important in Lincolnshire and by the end of the 10th century, comparable in output to that of York. After establishment of the Danelaw in 886, Lincoln became one of the Five East Midland Boroughs. Excavations at Flaxengate reveal that an area deserted since Roman times received timber-framed buildings fronting a new street system in about 900. Lincoln underwent an economic explosion with the settlement of the Danes. Like York, the Upper City seems to have had purely administrative functions up to 850 or so, while the Lower City, down the hill towards the River Witham, may have been largely deserted. By 950, however, the Witham banks were developed, the Lower City resettled and the suburb of Wigford emerging as a trading centre. In 1068, two years after the Norman conquest of England, William I ordered Lincoln Castle to be built on the site of the old Roman settlement, for the same strategic reasons and controlling the same road.

Green cloth

During the Anarchy, in 1141 Lincoln was the site of a battle between King Stephen and the forces of Empress Matilda, led by her illegitimate half-brother Robert, 1st Earl of Gloucester. After fierce fighting in the city streets, Stephen's forces were defeated and Stephen himself captured and taken to Bristol.

By 1150, Lincoln was among the wealthiest towns in England, based economically on cloth and wool exported to Flanders; Lincoln weavers had set up a guild in 1130 to produce Lincoln Cloth, especially the fine dyed "scarlet" and "green", whose reputation was later enhanced by the legendary Robin Hood wearing woollens of Lincoln green. In the Guildhall, surmounting the city gate called the Stonebow, the ancient Council Chamber contains Lincoln's civic insignia, a fine collection of civic regalia.

Outside the precincts of cathedral and castle, the old quarter clustered round the Bailgate and down Steep Hill to the High Bridge, whose half-timbered housing juts out over the river. There are three ancient churches: St Mary le Wigford and St Peter at Gowts, both 11th century in origin, and St Mary Magdalene, from the late 13th century. The last is an unusual English dedication to a saint whose cult was coming into vogue on the European continent at the time.

Lincoln was home to one of five main Jewish communities in England, well established before it was officially noted in 1154. In 1190, anti-Semitic riots that started in King's Lynn, Norfolk, spread to Lincoln; the Jewish community took refuge with royal officials, but their homes were plundered. The so-called House of Aaron has a two-storey street frontage that is essentially 12th century and a nearby Jew's House likewise bears witness to the Jewish population. In 1255, the affair called "The Libel of Lincoln" in which prominent Lincoln Jews, accused of ritual murder of a Christian boy (Little Saint Hugh of Lincoln in medieval folklore) were sent to the Tower of London and 18 executed. The Jews were all expelled in 1290.

Thirteenth-century Lincoln was England's third largest city and a favourite of more than one king. In the First Barons' War it was caught in the strife between the king and rebel barons allied with the French. Here and at Dover the French and Rebel army was defeated. Thereafter the town was pillaged for having sided with Prince Louis. In the Second Barons' War, of 1266, the disinherited rebels attacked the Jews of Lincoln, ransacked the synagogue and burned the records that registered debts.

Decline, dissolution and damage
Some historians have the city's fortunes declining from the 14th century, but others argue that it remained buoyant in trade and communications well into the 15th. In 1409, the city became a county corporate: the County of the City of Lincoln, formerly part of the West Riding of Lindsey since at least the time of the Domesday Book. Additional rights were then conferred by successive monarchs, including those of an assay town (controlling metal manufacturing, for example). The oldest surviving secular drama in English, The Interlude of the Student and the Girl (c. 1300), may have originated from Lincoln.

Lincoln's coat of arms, not officially endorsed by the College of Arms, is believed to date from the 14th century. It is Argent on a cross gules a fleur-de-lis or. The cross is believed to derive from the Diocese. The fleur-de-lis symbolises the cathedral dedication to the Virgin Mary. The motto is CIVITAS LINCOLNIA ("City of Lincoln").

The dissolution of the monasteries cut Lincoln's main source of diocesan income and dried up the network of patronage controlled by the bishop. Seven monasteries closed in the city alone, as did several nearby abbeys, which further diminished the region's political power. A symbol of Lincoln's economic and political decline came in 1549, when the cathedral's great spire rotted and collapsed and was not replaced. However, the comparative poverty of post-medieval Lincoln preserved pre-medieval structures that would probably have been lost under more prosperous conditions.

Between 1642 and 1651 in the English Civil War, Lincoln was on a frontier between the Royalist and Parliamentary forces and changed hands several times. Many buildings were badly damaged. Lincoln now had no major industry and no easy access to the sea. It suffered as the rest of the country was beginning to prosper in the early 18th century, travellers often commenting on what had essentially become a one-street town.

Revolutions
By the Georgian era, Lincoln's fortunes began to pick up, thanks in part to the Agricultural Revolution. Reopening of the Foss Dyke canal eased imports of coal and other raw materials vital to industry. Along with the economic growth of Lincoln in this period, the city boundaries were spread to include the West Common. To this day, an annual Beat the Boundaries walk takes place along its perimeter.

Coupled with the arrival of railway links, Lincoln boomed again during the Industrial Revolution, and several famous companies arose, such as Ruston's, Clayton's, Proctor's and William Foster's. Lincoln began to excel in heavy engineering, by building locomotives, steam shovels and all manner of heavy machinery.

A permanent military presence came with 1857 completion of the "Old Barracks" (now held by the Museum of Lincolnshire Life). They were replaced by the "New Barracks" (now Sobraon Barracks) in 1890, when Lincoln Drill Hall in Broadgate also opened.

20th and 21st centuries

Lincoln was hit by typhoid in November 1904 – August 1905 caused by polluted drinking water from Hartsholme Lake and the River Witham. Over 1,000 people contracted the disease and fatalities totalled 113, including the man responsible for the city's water supply, Liam Kirk of Baker Crescent. Near the beginning of the epidemic, Dr Alexander Cruickshank Houston installed a chlorine disinfection system just ahead of the poorly operating, slow sand filter, to kill the fatal bacteria. Chlorination of the water continued until 1911, when a new supply was implemented. Lincoln's chlorination episode was an early use of chlorine to disinfect a water supply. Westgate Water Tower was built to provide new supplies.

In the two world wars, Lincoln switched to war production. The first ever tanks were invented, designed and built in Lincoln by William Foster & Co. in the First World War and population growth provided more workers for greater expansion. The tanks were tested on land now covered by Tritton Road in the south-west suburbs. In the Second World War, Lincoln produced an array of war goods: tanks, aircraft, munitions and military vehicles.

Ruston & Hornsby produced diesel engines for ships and locomotives, then by teaming up with former colleagues of Frank Whittle and Power Jets Ltd, in the early 1950s, R & H (which became RGT) opened the first production line for gas turbine engines for land-based and sea-based energy production. Its success made it the city's largest single employer, providing over 5,000 jobs in its factory and research facilities, making it a rich takeover target for industrial conglomerates. It was subsumed by English Electric in November 1966, which was then bought by GEC in 1968, with diesel engine production being transferred to the Ruston Diesels Division in Newton-le-Willows, Lancashire, at the former Vulcan Foundry.

Pelham Works merged with Alstom of France in the late 1980s and was then bought in 2003 by Siemens of Germany as Siemens Industrial Turbomachinery. This includes what is left of Napier Turbochargers. Plans came early in 2008 for a new plant outside the city at Teal Park, North Hykeham. Still, Siemens made large redundancies and moved jobs to Sweden and the Netherlands. The factory now employs 1300. R & H's former Beevor Foundry is now owned by Hoval Group, making industrial boilers (wood chip). The Aerospace Manufacturing Facility (AMF) in Firth Road passed from Alstom Aerospace Ltd to ITP Engines UK in January 2009.

Lincoln's second largest private employer is James Dawson and Son, a belting and hose maker founded in the late 19th century. Its two sites are in Tritton Road. The main one, next to the University of Lincoln, used Lincoln's last coal-fired boiler until it was replaced by gas in July 2018.

New suburbs appeared after 1945, but heavy industry declined towards the end of the 20th century. Much development, notably around the Brayford area, has followed the construction of the University of Lincoln's Brayford Campus, which opened in 1996. In 2012, Bishop Grosseteste teaching college was also awarded university status.

Economy
Lincoln's economy is based mainly on public administration, commerce, arable farming and tourism, with industrial relics like Ruston (now Siemens) remaining, although many of Lincoln's industrial giants have ceased production, leaving empty industrial warehouse-like buildings. More recently these have become multi-occupied units, with the likes of Lincs FM radio station (in the Titanic Works) and LA Fitness gym taking space. The main employment sectors are public administration, education and health, with 34 per cent of the workforce. Distribution, restaurants and hotels account for 25 per cent.

Like many other cities, Lincoln has a growing IT economy, with many e-commerce mail order companies, along with a plethora of other, more conventional small industrial businesses. One reason behind the University of Lincoln was to increase inward investment and act as a springboard for small firms. Its presence has also drawn more licensed premises to the town centre around the Brayford Pool. A small business unit next door to a university accommodation building, the Think Tank, opened in June 2009.

Of the two main electronics firms, Chelmsford-based e2V (Associated Electrical Industries before 1961) is situated between Carholme Road (A57) and the Foss Dyke, next-door to Carholme Golf Club; and Dynex Semiconductor (formerly Marconi Electronic Devices) in Doddington Road (B1190) near the A46 bypass and North Hykeham. Bifrangi, an Italian maker of crankshafts for off-road vehicles using a screw press, is based at the former Tower Works owned by Smith-Clayton Forge Ltd.

Lincoln is the hub for settlements such as Welton, Saxilby, Skellingthorpe and Washingborough, which look to it for most services and employment needs. Added they raise the population to 165,000. Lincoln is the main centre for jobs and facilities in Central Lincolnshire and performs a regional role over much of Lincolnshire and parts of Nottinghamshire. According to a document entitled "Central Lincolnshire Local Plan Core Strategy", Lincoln has a "travel-to-work" area with a population of about 300,000. Its two universities, gained since 1994, contribute to its growth in the services sector. Blocks of flats, restaurants and entertainment venues have appeared. Entertainment venues linked to the universities include The Engine Shed and The Venue Cinema.

In 2021, Lincoln joined the UK's Key Cities network.

Retail parks
Around the Tritton Road (B1003) trading estate, new businesses have begun trading from large units with car parking. Lincoln has a choice of seven large national supermarkets (Tesco, Asda, Sainsbury, Waitrose, Morrisons, Aldi and Lidl).

St Mark's Square complex had a Debenhams as its flagship store until 2021. The accompanying trading estate still has well-known chain stores.

Tourism

The city is a tourist centre for visitors to historic buildings that include the cathedral, the castle and the medieval Bishop's Palace.

The Collection, of which the Usher Gallery is now part, is an important attraction, partly in a purpose-built venue. It currently contains over 2,000,000 objects, and was one of the four finalists for the 2006 Gulbenkian Prize. Any material from official archaeological excavations in Lincolnshire is eventually deposited there. Other attractions include the Museum of Lincolnshire Life and the International Bomber Command Centre.

Tranquil destinations close by are Whisby Nature Reserve and Hartsholme Country Park (including the Swanholme Lakes SSSI), while noisier entertainment can be found at Scampton airfield, Waddington airfield (base of the RAF's Red Arrows jet aerobatic team), the County Showground or the Cadwell Park motor racing circuit near Louth.

Early each December the Bailgate area holds a Christmas Market in and around the Castle grounds, shaped by the traditional German-style Christmas markets, including that of Lincoln's twin town Neustadt an der Weinstrasse. In 2010, for the first time, the event was cancelled due to "atrocious" snowfalls across most of the United Kingdom. It succumbed again in December 2020 due to the COVID-19 pandemic.

Demographics
In the 2021 census, the population of Lincoln district was 103,813. The largest ethnic group was White British at over 92.2%, followed by South Asian at 3.2%, Mixed race at 2%, Black British at 1.4%, other ethnic minorities made up 0.9% and Arab were 0.2%. This makes the ethnic makeup of the city 92% White and 8% ethnic minorities.

Religious sites

Lincoln is home to many active and former churches, the city has around 34 or more active churches. These serve the city centre and outer suburbs of the city and urban area. The city has three mosques; these are located on Orchard Street and Dixon Street. The Lincoln Grandstand is sometimes hired out for Jumu'ah Salaah prayers. The city has no Sikh or Hindu temples, with the nearest ones being in Scunthorpe, Grimsby, Nottingham and Doncaster. The city has two Jewish synagogues on Steep Hill and Eastbrook Road. As well as an international temple on James Street.

Many of the notable churches in the city include: St Mary le Wigford, St Giles, St Benedicts, St Swithin's, Lincoln Cathedral, St Hugh's, St Katherine's, Alive Church, Saint Peter at Gowts, Central Methodist Church, St Nicholas and Greek Orthodox Church of St Basil the Great and St Paisios. Among others in the city and outer suburbs.

Cathedral

Construction of the first Lincoln Cathedral within a close or walled precinct facing the castle began when the see was removed from the quiet backwater of Dorchester-on-Thames, Oxfordshire. It was completed in 1092 and rebuilt after a fire, but succumbed to an earthquake in 1185. When complete, the central spire is widely accepted to have succeeded the Great Pyramids of Egypt as the world's tallest man-made structure.

The Lincoln bishops were among the magnates of medieval England. The Diocese of Lincoln, the largest in England, had more monasteries than the rest of England put together, and the diocese was supported by large estates. When Magna Carta was drawn up in 1215, one of the witnesses was Hugh of Wells, Bishop of Lincoln. One of only four surviving originals of the document is preserved in Lincoln Castle.

Among the famous bishops of Lincoln were Robert Bloet, the magnificent justiciar to Henry I, Hugh of Avalon, the cathedral builder canonised as St Hugh of Lincoln, Robert Grosseteste, the 13th-century intellectual, Henry Beaufort, chancellor of Henry V and Henry VI, Thomas Rotherham, a politician deeply involved in the Wars of the Roses, Philip Repyngdon, chaplain to Henry IV and defender of Wycliffe, and Thomas Wolsey, the lord chancellor of Henry VIII. Theologian William de Montibus headed the cathedral school and was its chancellor until he died in 1213.

The administrative centre was the Bishop's Palace, the third element in the central complex. When built in the late 12th century by Hugh of Lincoln, the Bishop's Palace was one of the most important buildings in England. Its East Hall over a vaulted undercroft is the earliest surviving example of a roofed domestic hall. The chapel range and entrance tower were built by Bishop William of Alnwick, who modernised the palace in the 1430s. Both Henry VIII and James I were guests there. The palace was sacked in 1648 by royalist troops during the civil war.

Geography and environment
The city lies on the River Witham, which flows through this gap.

The city urban area extends to the town of North Hykeham and the villages of Bracebridge Heath, Branston, Burton, Canwick, Cherry Willingham, Dunholme, Heighington, Nettleham, North Greetwell, Saxilby, Skellingthorpe, South Hykeham, Thorpe on the Hill, Waddington, Welton and Washingborough. These villages act as commuter villages to the city and to nearby cities of Doncaster, Hull and Sheffield as well as the towns of Gainsborough, Grantham, Grimsby, Louth, Market Rasen, Newark-on-Trent, Retford, Rotherham, Scunthorpe, Sleaford and Worksop.

Uphill and downhill
Due to the variation in altitude, which presents something of an obstacle, Lincoln is divided informally into two zones: uphill and downhill.

The uphill area comprises the northern part of the city, on top of the Lincoln Cliff (to the north of the gap). This includes the historical quarter, including Lincoln Cathedral, Lincoln Castle and the Medieval Bishop's Palace, known locally as The Bail (though described in tourist literature as the Cathedral Quarter). It also has residential suburbs to the north and north-east. The downhill area comprises the city centre and suburbs to the south and south-west. Steep Hill is a narrow, pedestrian street directly connecting the two. It passes through an archway known as the Stonebow.

This divide, peculiar to Lincoln, was once an important class distinction, with uphill more affluent and downhill less so. The distinction dates from the time of the Norman conquest, when the religious and military elite occupied the hilltop. The expansion of suburbs in both parts of the city since the mid-19th century has diluted the distinction.

Ecology
The mute swan is an iconic species for Lincoln. Many pairs nest each year beside the Brayford, and they feature on the university's heraldic emblem. Other bird life within the city includes peregrine falcon, tawny owl and common kingfisher.

Mammals on the city edges include red fox, roe deer and least weasel. European perch, northern pike and bream are among fishes seen in the Witham and Brayford. Nature reserves around the city include Greetwell Hollow SSSI, Swanholme SSSI, Whisby Nature Park, Boultham Mere and Hartsholme Country Park.

Since 2016, little egrets have nested in the Birchwood area and otters appeared in the River Witham. Both are native to Britain and repopulating the area after near extermination.

Several invasive species of plants and animals have reached Lincoln. Japanese knotweed and Himalayan balsam are Asian plant species around the River Witham. Galinsoga and Amsinckia are American species found among city weeds, also American mink which are occasionally seen on the Witham.

Built-up area
The Lincoln built-up area or Lincoln urban area extends outside of the city boundaries and includes the town of North Hykeham and the villages of Bracebridge, South Hykeham, and Waddington. It had a population of 115,000 according to the 2011 census.

The other outlying villages of Skellingthorpe, Bracebridge Heath, Washingborough, Branston, Burton-by-Lincoln, Nettleham, Cherry Willingham, Thorpe-on-the-Hill, and Canwick have also been described as part of the urban area, but not according to the Office for National Statistics. This would put the population of the urban area at roughly 130,000.

Transport

Rail
Lincoln is served by Lincoln station and is the city's main railway station. Other railway stations near the city are Hykeham and Saxilby. Another station in the city was Lincoln St Marks to the south of the city. That station has since closed, but is now used for commercial purposes.

The city was once connected to many railway lines. Some old railway relics and stations that served it and its surrounding commuter suburbs are still visible. Notable closed stations close to the city include Waddington, Skellingthorpe, Washingborough, Skellingthorpe (Great Northern Railway), Branston & Heighton and Reepham. Two of the former railway lines are now footpaths.

Road
The city lies on the A57, A46, A15 and A158 roads. These bring high levels of through traffic and as a result the city has had many bypasses built. To the north west is the £19-million A46 bypass opened in December 1985. On 19 December 2020 the £122-million A15 Eastern bypass was completed. A southern bypass formally known as North Hykeham relief road is due to start construction in 2025 and will be the final section of a complete ring road around the city.

Until the 1980s, the only two trunk roads through Lincoln were the A46 and A15, both feeding traffic along the High Street. At the intersection of Guildhall Street and the High Street, these met at the termination of the A57. North of the city centre, the former A15 (Riseholme Road) is now the B1226, and the old A46 (Nettleham Road) is now the B1182. The early northern inner ring-road, formed of Yarborough Road and Yarborough Crescent, is numbered B1273.

Air
East Midlands Airport, 43 miles from Lincoln, is the main international airport serving the county. It mainly handles European flights with low-cost airlines. Humberside Airport, 29 miles north of Lincoln, is the only airport located in the county. It has a small number of flights mainly to hub airports such as Amsterdam. From 2005 until 2022, Doncaster Sheffield Airport also served Lincoln.

Education

Higher education
The older of Lincoln's two higher education institutions, Bishop Grosseteste University, was started as a teacher training college linked to the Anglican Church in 1862. During the 1990s it branched out into other subject areas with a focus on the arts and drama. It became a university college in 2006 with degree powers taken over from the University of Leicester. It gained university status in 2012. An annual graduation celebration takes place in Lincoln Cathedral.}

The larger University of Lincoln started as the University of Lincolnshire and Humberside in 1996, when the University of Humberside opened a Lincoln campus next to Brayford Pool. Lincoln School of Art and Design (which was Lincolnshire's main outlet for higher education) and Riseholme Agricultural College, previously been part of De Montfort University in Leicester, were absorbed into the University of Lincoln in 2001, and subsequently the Lincoln campus took priority over the Hull campus.

The name changed to the University of Lincoln in September 2002. In the 2021–2022 academic year, a total of 18,705 university students studied in the city.

Further education
Further education in Lincoln is provided by Lincoln College, Lincolnshire's largest education institution with 18,500 students, 2,300 of them full-time. There is a specialist creative college, Access Creative, offering courses in music, media and games design to some 180 students, all full-time.

Schools

The school system in Lincoln is anomalous within Lincolnshire despite being part of the same local education authority (LEA), as most of the county retained the grammar-school system.

In 1952, William Farr School was founded in Welton, a nearby village. Lincoln itself had four single-sex grammar schools until September 1974.

The Priory Academy LSST converted to academy status in 2008, in turn establishing The Priory Federation of Academies. The Priory Witham Academy was formed when the federation absorbed Moorlands Infant School, Usher Junior School and Ancaster High School. The Priory City of Lincoln Academy was formed when the City of Lincoln Community College merged into the federation. Both schools were rebuilt after substantial investment by the federation. Cherry Willingham School joined the federation in 2017, becoming The Priory Pembroke Academy.

The Lincolnshire LEA was ranked 32nd in the country based on its proportion of pupils attaining at least 5 A–C grades at GCSE including maths and English (62.2% compared with a national average of 58.2%).

There are four special-needs schools in Lincoln: Fortuna Primary School (5–11 year olds), Sincil Sports College (11–16), St Christopher's School (3–16) and St Francis Community Special School (2–18).

Media
The local newspaper, the Lincolnshire Echo, was founded in 1894. Local radio stations are BBC Radio Lincolnshire on 94.9 FM, its commercial rival Lincs FM on 102.2FM and Lincoln City Radio on 103.6 FM a community radio station catering mainly for listeners over 50. The Lincolnite is an online mobile publication covering the greater-Lincoln area. Local listeners can also receive Siren FM, on 107.3 FM from the University of Lincoln.

The student publication The Linc is available online and in print and targets the University of Lincoln's student population.

BBC Look North has a bureau in Lincoln as part of its coverage of Lincolnshire and East Yorkshire. The three TV reporters based in Lincoln serve both BBC Look North and East Midlands Today. ITV News also hold a newsroom in Lincoln.

Sport

Lincoln's professional football team is Lincoln City FC, nicknamed "The Imps", which plays at the Sincil Bank stadium on the southern edge of the city. The collapse of ITV Digital, which owed Lincoln City FC more than £100,000, in 2002 saw the team faced with bankruptcy, but it was saved by a fund-raising venture among fans, which returned ownership of the club to them, where it has remained since. The club was the first to be relegated from the English Football League, when automatic relegation to the Football Conference was introduced from the 1986–87 season. Lincoln City regained its league place at the first attempt and held onto it until the 2010–11 season, when it was again relegated to the Football Conference.

Lincoln City was the first club managed by Graham Taylor, who went on to manage the England national football team from 1990 to 1993. He was at Lincoln City from 1972 to 1977, during which time the club won promotion from the Fourth Division as champions in 1976. The club also won the Football League Division Three North title on three separate occasions, a joint record. Its most successful era was in the early 1980s, winning promotion from the Fourth Division in 1981 and narrowly missing promotion to the Second Division in the two years that followed. It reached the quarter-finals of the FA Cup in 2017, beating several teams in the top two tiers of English football before being defeated by Arsenal. More recently Lincoln City won Football League Two in the 2018–2019 season and the EFL Trophy in 2018. It is currently managed by Michael Appleton.

Lincoln is also home to Lincoln United FC, Lincoln Moorlands Railway FC and Lincoln Griffins Ladies FC.

Lincoln hosts upcoming sports facilities such American football's Lincolnshire Bombers, which plays in the BAFA National Leagues, the Lincolnshire Bombers Roller Girls, the Imposters Rollergirls, and hosts Lincoln Rowing centre on the River Witham. Lindum Hockey Club plays in the north of the city. Since 1956 the city has played host to the Lincoln Grand Prix one-day cycle race, which for some 30 years has used a city-centre finishing circuit incorporating the challenging 1-in-6 cobbled ascent of Michaelgate. Since 2013 the city has had a professional wrestling promotion and training academy, Lincoln Fight Factory Wrestling. The Lincoln Lions rugby union team has been playing since 1902.

Two short-lived greyhound racing tracks were opened by Lincolnshire Greyhound Racing Association. One was the Highfield track in Hykeham Road, which opened on 13 September 1931, and the second the Lincoln Speedway on the Rope Walk, which opened on 4 June 1932. Racing at both was independent, as they were "flapping" tracks unaffiliated to the sport's governing body, the National Greyhound Racing Club.

Notable people
In alphabetical order:
Aaron of Lincoln (c. 1125–1186), medieval Jewish financier
Marlon Beresford (born 1969), professional footballer. He made over 400 league appearances, trained at Sheffield Wednesday and played for league clubs, notably Burnley, Middlesbrough and Luton Town.
Gary Blades (born 1980), professional darts player competing in the Professional Darts Corporation
George Boole (1815–1864), mathematician, developer of Boolean logic, born in Lincoln in 1815
William Byrd (c. 1539–40 or 1543–1623), composer, organist attached to Lincoln Cathedral from 1563 to 1572
George Francis Carline (1855–1920), artist, born in Lincoln
Jamie Clapham (born 1975), former professional footballer. He currently a first-team coach at Barnsley F.C.
Sam Clucas (born 1990), footballer, who currently plays with Stoke City F.C. He was born and attended school in Lincoln.
Peter Day (born 1947), broadcaster. He attended Lincoln Grammar School.
Penelope Fitzgerald (1916–2000), novelist, biographer, born in Penelope Mary Knox in 1916
Keith Fordyce (1928–2011), broadcaster, born in Lincoln
Lee Frecklington (born 1985), footballer. He last played for the League One side Lincoln City.
James Hall (historian) (1846–1914), born and raised in Lincoln before leaving for teacher training in 1864, he subsequently settled in Cheshire
Francis Hill (1899–1980), local historian, mayor of Lincoln and Chancellor of the University of Nottingham, born in Lincoln in 1899
William Hilton  (1786–1839), portrait and history painter, born in Lincoln
John Hurt (1940–2017), actor. He attended Lincoln School.
Colonel John Hutchinson (1615–1664), Roundhead politician and signatory to the death warrant of King Charles I. He attended Lincoln Free School.
Benjamin Lany (1591–1675), academic, royal chaplain and religious writer. He was Bishop of Lincoln in 1663–1667.
William Logsdail (1859–1944), painter, born in Lincoln
Mary Mackie (née Kathleen Mary Whitlam, living), novelist and non-fiction writer, born in Lincoln in the Second World War, she attended Lincoln Christ's Hospital High School
Karen Maitland (born 1956), English author of medieval thriller fiction
Neville Marriner (1924–2016), violinist, conductor, founder of the Academy of St Martin in the Fields, born in Lincoln and educated at Lincoln Grammar School
Ross McLaren (born 1991), actor, born in Lincoln and trained at the Joyce Mason School of Dance
Rose Mead (1867–1946), portrait painter. She attended Lincoln School of Art.
Henry Whitehead Moss (1841–1917), born at Lincoln, he went to Lincoln School before attending Shrewsbury School where he became headmaster
Paul Palmer (born 1974), swimmer who won an Olympic silver medal at the Atlanta Olympic Games in 1996, he was twice a short-course world champion
William Pool (c. 1783–1856), maritime inventor. He worked in Lincoln in the 1820s and 1830s.
Thomas Pownall (1722–1805), politician, Governor of the Province of Massachusetts Bay
Philip Priestley (1936–2018), chemist and author. He attended City School.
Steve Race (1921–2009), musician, broadcaster, host of Radio 4's My Music 1967–1993. He was born in Lincoln and attended Lincoln School in 1932–1939.
Fanny Robertson (1765–1855), actress and theatre owner, manager of The Lincoln Circuit of theatres
Charlotte Scott (1858–1931), mathematician, born in Lincoln
John Taylor (1781–1864), publisher of John Keats and John Clare. He attended Lincoln Grammar School.
William Tritton (1875–1946), Chairman of William Foster & Co. Ltd from 1911 to 1939, directly involved in developing the military vehicle, the tank
James Ward Usher (1845–1921), jeweller and philanthropist. He spent his life in the city.
William T. Warrener (1861–1934), English painter, born in Lincoln in 1861. He attended Lincoln School of Art.
Juan Watterson (born 1980), Manx politician, Speaker of the House of Keys. He studied at the University of Lincoln.
Victor Wells-Cole (1897–1987), first-class cricketer, British Army officer

International relations

Twin towns
Lincoln is twinned with:

Freedom of the city
The following people and military units have received the Freedom of the City of Lincoln.

Individuals
 Rt Hon Lord Cormack : 18 March 2022.

Military units
 RAF Waddington: 25 April 1959.
 RAF Scampton: 14 May 1993.
 2nd Battalion The Royal Anglian Regiment: 1997.
 The Grenadier Guards: 8 May 2008.

Climate
Lincoln has a typical East Midland maritime climate of warm summers and mild winters. The nearest Met Office weather station is at RAF Waddington,  to the south. A former weather station holds the record for the lowest daytime maximum temperature recorded in England in the month of December:  on 17 December 1981.

See also

Attractions

Empowerment
Jew's House
Jew's Court
Lincoln Arboretum
Lincoln Castle
Lincoln Cathedral
Lincoln City F.C.
Lincoln Imp
Museum of Lincolnshire Life
Newport Arch
Norman House
Steep Hill
The Collection (Lincolnshire)
The Lawn, Lincoln
Usher Gallery
Viking Way

Places

Boultham, Lincoln
Engine Shed
Hartsholme Country Park
High Street, Lincoln
Theatre Royal, Lincoln
Ritz Theatre (Lincoln, England)
Lincoln Drill Hall
Lincoln Medieval Bishop's Palace
Lincoln Performing Arts Centre
Lincoln Racecourse
St Catherine's, Lincoln
St Hugh's Church, Lincoln
St Swithin's Church, Lincoln
Steep Hill
University of Lincoln
Bishop Grosseteste University
Sincil Bank

People

Aaron of Lincoln
Hugh of Lincoln
Little Saint Hugh of Lincoln

Societies and groups

The Lincoln Philosophy Café
Lincoln Record Society

Society for Lincolnshire History and Archaeology at Jew's Court

Arms

Notes

References

Sources

Francis Hill, 1948. Medieval Lincoln (Cambridge: University Press)

Footnotes

External links

City of Lincoln Council
University of Lincoln
Bishop Grosseteste University

Video links
Pathe Newsreel, 1950, Europes largest foundry opens in Lincoln
Pathe newsreel, 1934, about Lincoln 

 
Populated places established in the 1st century BC
Local government in Lincolnshire
County towns in England
Coloniae (Roman)
Non-metropolitan districts of Lincolnshire
Local government districts of the East Midlands
Towns in Lincolnshire
Cities in the East Midlands
Unparished areas in Lincolnshire
Boroughs in England